Gloomy Sunday and Other Bright Moments is an album by jazz trombonist and arranger Bob Brookmeyer recorded in 1961 for the Verve label. Brookmeyer said: "I consider it my pride and joy. I took many creative risks here, most based on the heels of working with Bill [Finegan]. I used woodwinds, double reeds and other instrument configurations I hadn't used before. My attitude toward the orchestration was really a big step forward in my development".

Reception

AllMusic awarded the album 4 stars.

Track listing
 "Caravan" (Juan Tizol, Duke Ellington, Irving Mills) - 3:40
 "Why Are You Blue" (Gary McFarland) - 4:22
 "Some of My Best Friends" (Al Cohn) - 5:10
 "Gloomy Sunday" (Rezső Seress) - 5:40
 "Ho Hum" (Bob Brookmeyer) - 4:40
 "Detour Ahead" (Herb Ellis, Johnny Frigo, Lou Carter) - 4:30
 "Days Gone By; Oh My!" (Gary McFarland) - 5:00
 "Where, Oh Where" (Cole Porter) - 3:45

Personnel 
Bob Brookmeyer - valve trombone
Bernie Glow, Joe Newman (tracks 3 & 4), Doc Severinsen, Clark Terry, Nick Travis (tracks 1, 2 & 5–8) - trumpet
Wayne Andre, Billy Byers (tracks 1, 3, 4, 6 & 8), Bill Elton (tracks 2, 5 & 7), Alan Raph - trombone
Wally Kane - bassoon (tracks 4 & 8) 
Eddie Caine - alto saxophone, flute 
Phil Woods -  alto saxophone, clarinet (tracks 2-5 & 7)
Gene Quill (track 1), Eddie Wasserman (tracks 2 & 4) - alto saxophone
Phil Bodner - tenor saxophone, oboe, English horn
Al Cohn - tenor saxophone (tracks 1–3, 5 & 7) 
Gene Allen - baritone saxophone, bass clarinet
Eddie Costa - vibraphone, percussion
Hank Jones - piano
George Duvivier - bass
 Mel Lewis - drums
Bob Brookmeyer (tracks 5–8), Ralph Burns (track 1), Al Cohn (track 3), Gary McFarland (track 2), Eddie Sauter (track 4) - arranger

References 

1961 albums
Verve Records albums
Bob Brookmeyer albums
Albums arranged by Ralph Burns
Albums arranged by Gary McFarland
Albums produced by Creed Taylor